Zentralgewerkschaftskommission des Deutschen Gewerkschaftsbundes in der Tschechoslowakischen Republik ('Central Commission of German Trade Unions in the Czechoslovak Republic') was a German Social Democratic trade union centre in Czechoslovakia. From 1927 onwards, it was an autonomous structure inside the Czechoslovak labour centre OSČ. The organization was dissolved as Czechoslovakia fell under German occupation.

Early period
The organization was founded in July 1919. In 1920 the name Gewerkschaftsbund was adopted, and a headquarters was set up in Liberec. Gewerkschaftsbund emerged as a prominent force in the amongst labour movements in Czechoslovakia, having around 75% of unionized German workers as its members in 1921 (at the time Czechoslovakia had a general unionizing rate of 50%, one of the higher in Europe). Major unions affiliated to Gewerkschaftsbund were Textile Workers (90,878 members in 1921), Metalworkers (39,209 members in 1921) and Miners (37,582 members in 1921).

In 1922, Czechoslovak communists had formed a separate trade union centre, Mezinárodní všeodborový svaz (MVS). However, not all communist trade unionists joined MVS. As of 1926, there were around 15 000 communists inside the Gewerkschaftsbund affiliates.

Merger into OSČ
In 1927 Gewerkschaftsbund merged into the main Czechoslovak trade union centre, the Social Democratic Odborové sdružení československé (OSČ). The organization continued to function as an autonomous body inside OSČ until the unions were banned following the German occupation.

Leadership
Franz Macoun was the general secretary of the organization from 1920 to 1938. Macoun was a Member of Parliament for the German Social Democratic Workers Party between 1929 and 1938.

Publications
The organization issued the publication Gewerkschafts-Jugend ('Trade Union Youth') between 1934-1937.

Membership

Membership of Gewerkschaftsbund affiliates in 1937

References

National trade union centers of Czechoslovakia
International Federation of Trade Unions
1919 establishments in Czechoslovakia
1939 disestablishments in Czechoslovakia
Trade unions established in 1919
Trade unions disestablished in 1939